Binalbagan Catholic College, also known as BCC, is located at the center of the main business section of Binalbagan and one of the well known private schools in the island of Negros in the Philippines, particularly in the southern part. It is run by the Catholic Church.

History

BCC High School Department
Shortly after the arrival of the Columban Fathers, Catholic High Schools appeared in most of the parishes under the Columban Fathers. With this background, Binalbagan Catholic High School was founded in June 1957 by then Fr. Thomas Cronin, then the Parish Priest of Binalbagan. It started 240 students. Mrs. Teresa Guanco was the first principal. The school started with 6 classrooms. About January 1958, six months after its conception, Father Patrick Hurley took over as Director and stayed on until the end of the school year 1968–1969.

School year 1978-79 was marked by significant change in the administration of BCC which of course included in the high school administration. For the first time, the school administration was turned over completely to the Presentation Sisters by the Columban Fathers. Sr. Mary Aquila A. Sy was the first Presentation Sister appointed as Directress of BCC. Sr. Puis Murphy was the first Presentation Sister in the High School department and Mrs. Pacita Y. Jo remained the principal. The faculty and staff turned 38 in the high school with an enrolment of 1,145 divided between the building in the church campus and the extension site. From 1973 to 1980, the high school department took over completely the extension site for the reason of the effective administration and maximization in the utilization of the time of the personnel. But it was only in school year 1993-1994 that the entire high school department was moved to the extension site with added new classrooms under the administration of Sr. Teresita Limsiaco.

In the year 1994–95, Sr. Ofelia Versoza was assigned as Directress. In the following year, it was taken over by Sr. Mary Aquilla Sy who served as School Head from 1995 to 2000. During her term, a new chapel was constructed in the high school campus. It was made possible though and by the generous donations of alumni, private companies and friends of the Presentation Sisters abroad.

From the school year 2000 the school adopted the principle of Team Management as the management style. The first set of administrative team was composed of Presentation Sisters and lay workers. Mrs. Josefina Sinaon was appointed as principal during this year and she stayed on until 2006.

Currently, the administrative team member is Sr. Joy H Puerta and the principal is Mrs. Flerida Demigillo who was once also the principal of Nuestra Señora De Las Nieves, the sister school of BCC.

For fifty years BCC continues to shine amidst struggles and hardship in rendering quality education, vis-à-vis educational innovation and trends.

It continues to move along educational stream together with other small schools in the diocese of Kabankalan.

BCC Elementary and College Department
In 1961, the college department was opened to enable her own high school graduates, as well as those from the neighboring towns, to obtain a college degree in Binalbagan. After a certain amount of difficulty with the Department of Education, a permit was obtained. Binalbagan Catholic School becomes Binalbagan Catholic College. The family of late Sabas and Carmen Locsin donated an 8,000-square-meter site. The Columban Priest provided some financial aid to build six new rooms.
Since then, the following courses were opened with government recognition and permit, to wit:
 Certificate in Secretarial Science (1962)
 Bachelor of Science in Commerce (1967)
 Bachelor of Science in Education (1967)
 Bachelor of Science in Elementary Education (1967)

The college department grew especially in the Education program. There was a need for an elementary school to serve as laboratory school for the Education students, so, a few years later it was decided to look for another site. Again, another generous family in Binalbagan came to aid with the donation of one hectare just across the site of the college department. They were Bienvenido and Gregoria Yulo and the latter's sister, Mariette Yulo.
Aside from the elementary pupils, the first year and second year students also occupied the site.

In the year 1974, Mrs. Guanco retired as principal of the high school department. A presentation Sister then became the principal until Mrs. Pacita Y. Jo took over.

The school year 1978-79 was marked by a significant change in the administration of BCC which included the elementary and the high school departments. The Columban Father's turned over the school administration to the presentation Sister to be appointed as Directress of BCC. Sr. Pius Murphy was assigned in High School department while Mrs. Jo remained the principal. The Board of Trustees, as its governing body, had Bishop Antonio Y. Fortrich as the chairman.

During Sr. Aquila Sy's term from 1978 to 1985, BCC, in order to keep its thrust and orientation, launched its social transformation program. The mission statement was formulated and the departmental goals were based upon it. Seminars and workshops were conducted to help update the teacher's knowledge and competency and the use of materials to the Philippine need and situation. BCC became an affiliate of the Education Forum, one of the mission partners of the Association of Major Religious Superiors of the Philippines.

Major improvements in the school building, facilities, and equipment were done from 1982 to 1998. The three-story library building was constructed and the wooden corridors of the main building were replaced with concrete materials. The old laboratory rooms were renovated.

On September 2, 1984, Typhoon Nitang caused great damage to almost college buildings, blowing away roofs. The buildings were repaired through the generosity of the Columban Fathers, the Presentation Sister, and other church-related organizations.

The diocese of Bacolod became two dioceses in 1998. The towns from Binalbagan to Hinobaan, the southernmost town, became the Diocese of Kabangkalan. The school was formally turned over to the new diocese of Kabangkalan under the leadership of Bishop Vicente Navarra, D.D. The formal installation of the new diocese took place on February 11, 1998.

In the school year 1990-91 another course was offered, the Bachelor of Science in accountancy. This was a view of the phasing out by the Department of Education, Culture and Sports (DECS) of the Bachelor of Science in commerce, major in accounting.

Later, in effort to extend the use of the college facilities to the wider local community, the following courses were set up but discontinued due to lack of sufficient enrollees:
 5- month course in Bookkeeping
 5- month course in Stenography
 5- month course in Typewriting
 5- month course in Computer (by modules)

In the school year 1994-95 the Bachelor of Science in commerce, major in Entrepreneurship, and Bachelor of Science in commerce, major in data processing, were begun. In 1995–96, two-year course in computer secretarial, data processing and accounting science were offered. With the introduction of extra courses involving the use of computers it was deemed necessary to open and equip three computer rooms from 1995 to 1999.

In response to the call of the Second Plenary Council of the Philippines (PCPII) for evangelization through catecheses, and the need for qualified catechists in the diocese, and also in response to the school's mission statement a BSED major in religious education was introduced in 1993–1994, coordinated by Sr. Bernadette Purcell.

The changing societal context and changing thrust of the administrative heads continued to be the energy, which propelled BCC. Meanwhile, the orientation of the faculty and staff spelled the difference in bringing about the realization of the school mission.

Due to the continuous drive of the government for the so-called globalization, calling for excellence and the world competitiveness of the graduates, requirements for better facilities and higher standard for teachers became more demanding. Thus, the school year 1997-98 saw the completion of the High School Department annex and the second story of Elementary Department building.

The school year 1996-98 were marked by the rise in the academic competence of the elementary, high school, and the education graduates. The Elementary and the High School Departments made 100% passing in the National Academic Test. In addition, the High School ranked second highest among all the high schools in the province of Negros and ranked one of the top twenty schools of the provincial high schools in the whole country. The education graduates obtained ratings higher than the national passing percentage in the board examination.

In 1998, there was an effort of the school administration to process the accreditation of its programs. Committees were organized and a self-survey was conducted using the PAASCU self-survey instrument. However, due to financial constraint the other priorities, the initiative did not progress.

There have been areas, however, that did not bode well for the school. The Bachelor of Science in Accountancy, from which students graduated in the school year 1993–1994, had not been successful in coming up with board passers in the board examination for the Certified Public Accountants(CPAs). This was neither due to lack of competent students nor of competent instructors but financial constraint on the part of the students. In the school year 1997–1998, the school began to include in its already tight budget the financing of its honor students who are interested in becoming Certified Public Accountants. The fruit was not immediately ready for harvesting. The year 1998 was last year determining whether the Accounting Program would survive or be phased out? In the board examination of May 1998, two accounting students had passed the board examination and did so with high marks.

The Accountancy program produce four National Topnotchers since 1998 and continued to show better performance in the CPA board.

In March 1998, the construction of multipurpose center began. It was blessed by Bishop Vicente Navarra on August 30, 1998. It was named Nano Nagle GYM in honor of the founders of the Presentation Sisters.

While the country is reeling from the problems due to the global economic system prescribed by the International Monetary Fund (IMF), and wholeheartedly bought by the government, BCC continued to work for the dream. It promoted, among other thrusts, the sovereignty of the country, equal among the community of nations and a people with dignity and identity.

The congregation of the PBVM represented by Sr. Lourdes Healy worked for the school vision and mission through the Administrative Team in place of what was formerly the School Head.

The fear of the effect of tuition fee increase grew. The Presentation Sisters firmly stood by their charism and the vision-mission of the college, which is “the preferential option for the poor”.

In 2004, the need to work towards accreditation was inevitable. Enrollment in the Education Department fell. Accreditation of school's education program becomes one of the criteria in the ranking of Education graduates who applied in the public schools. The Administrative Team decided to process the accreditation of the three programs, namely: Accountancy, Commerce, and Education. Again, the faculty and staff were grouped into committees to look into the strength and weakness of the institution. Initially, the objective was only provide as basis for determining the areas in which the school had to implement measures for improvement.

Despite its limited financial resources, the college, though the Team beefed up its library holdings and increased the equipment in the Chemistry, Biology, and Computer Laboratories. A budget was set side to provide financial assistance to the faculty member wanted to pursue their master's degree.

By 2005, the Administrative Team wrote to PAASCU in intent to process the accreditation. Colloquia were focused on the accreditation process.

During the same school year, the college was given a temporary permit by the Commission on Higher Education (CHED-REGION VI) to offer the first year of its Bachelor of Science in Information Technology.

BCC Crest
The Nagle Coat of Arms has the horizontal bar fess is azure with tree diamonds in gold with nightingale on top of the escutcheon of shield shape surface. In heraldry, gold denoted generosity and elevation of the mind. The fess or band in the center of the shield is the military belt or girdle of honour. Azure or blue signified loyalty and truth. The oak design predominates. Under the escutcheon is a scroll bearing the Nagle motto: “Non Vox Votum”-Not a Voice but a Wish or more freely translated “NOT WORDS BUT DEEDS”.

The Presentation Sister adopted the Nagle Coat of Arms with some modifications. The nightingale was replaced by a cross and effulgence as found on the ring worn by the Presentation Sisters-symbol of faith and strength.

The motto on the Presentation Sisters can be seen in the Our Lady of Snows High School- “Laudute Dominum in Atrium Sancto Ejus” - “Adore the Lord in His Highest Court.”

BCC has adopted the Presentation Crest with the motto “Monstra Te Esse Matrem” – “Show to us that you are a Mother.

Identity
Binalbagan Catholic College is a Philippine institution of learning, owned by the Diocese of Kabankalan and administered by the Sisters of the Presentation of the Blessed Virgin Mary (PVBM), Philippine Region. It is a non-stock, non-profit corporation.

References

Universities and colleges in Negros Occidental
Catholic universities and colleges in the Philippines